Lunatic Soul is a progressive rock side-project, founded by Riverside vocalist and bass guitarist Mariusz Duda in 2008. Originally conceived to allow him to explore genres outside of rock, the project was described by Duda in 2014 as progressive, ambient, oriental and electronic. Lunatic Soul has released seven albums to date. The most recent album, Through Shaded Woods, was released on November 13, 2020, and has been described by Duda as 'more folky' than previous releases.

Discography

References

External links
 

Polish rock music groups
Musical groups established in 2008
Mystic Production artists
Polish progressive rock groups